Oliver H. P. Cowdery (October 3, 1806 – March 3, 1850) was an American Mormon leader who, with Joseph Smith, was an important participant in the formative period of the Latter Day Saint movement between 1829 and 1836. He was the first baptized Latter Day Saint, one of the Three Witnesses of the Book of Mormon's golden plates, one of the first Latter Day Saint apostles, and the Second Elder of the church.

In 1838, as Assistant President of the Church, Cowdery resigned and was excommunicated on charges of denying the faith. Cowdery claimed Joseph Smith had been engaging in a sexual relationship with Fanny Alger, a teenage servant in his home. Cowdery became a Methodist, and then in 1848, he returned to the Latter Day Saint movement.

Biography

Early life
Cowdery was born October 3, 1806, in Wells, Vermont. His father, William, a farmer, moved the family to Poultney in Rutland County, Vermont, when Cowdery was three. (Cowdery's mother Rebecca Fuller Cowdery died on September 3, 1809.) In his youth, Cowdery hunted for buried treasure using a divining rod.

At age 20 (c. 1826), Cowdery left Vermont for upstate New York, where his older brothers had settled. He clerked at a store for just over two years and in 1829 became a school teacher in Manchester, New York. Cowdery lodged with different families in the area, including that of Joseph Smith, Sr., who was said to have provided Cowdery with additional information about the golden plates of which Cowdery said he had heard "from all quarters."

Book of Mormon scribe and witness

Cowdery met Joseph Smith on April 5, 1829—a year and a day before the official founding of the church—and heard from him how he had received golden plates containing ancient Native American writings. Cowdery told Smith that he had seen the golden plates in a vision before the two ever met.

From April 7 to June 1829, Cowdery acted as Smith's primary scribe for the translation of the plates into what would later become the Book of Mormon. Cowdery also unsuccessfully attempted to translate part of the Book of Mormon by himself. Before meeting Cowdery, Smith had virtually stopped translating after the first 116 pages had been lost by Martin Harris. But working with Cowdery, Smith completed the manuscript in a remarkably short period (April–June 1829), during what Richard Bushman called a "burst of rapid-fire translation."

Cowdery and Smith said that on May 15, 1829, they received the Aaronic priesthood from the resurrected John the Baptist, after which they baptized each other in the Susquehanna River. Cowdery said that he and Smith later went into the forest and prayed "until a glorious light encircled us, and as we arose on account of the light, three persons stood before us dressed in white, their faces beaming with glory." One of the three announced that he was the Apostle Peter and said the others were the apostles James and John.

Later that year, Cowdery reported sharing a vision, along with Smith and David Whitmer, in which an angel showed him the golden plates. Martin Harris said he saw a similar vision later that day.  Cowdery, Whitmer and Harris signed a statement to that effect and became known as the Three Witnesses. Their testimony has been published in nearly every edition of the Book of Mormon.

Second Elder of the church
When the church was organized on April 6, 1830, Smith became "First Elder" and Cowdery "Second Elder." Although Cowdery was technically second in authority to Smith from the organization of the church through 1838, in practice Sidney Rigdon, Smith's "spokesman" and counselor in the First Presidency, began to supplant Cowdery as early as 1831. Cowdery held the position of Assistant President of the Church from 1834 until his resignation/excommunication in 1838. Cowdery was also a member of the first presiding high council of the church, organized in Kirtland, Ohio, in 1834.

On December 18, 1832, Cowdery married Elizabeth Ann Whitmer, the daughter of Peter Whitmer, Sr. and sister of David, John, Jacob and Peter Whitmer, Jr. They had six children, of whom only one daughter survived to maturity.

Cowdery helped Smith publish a series of Smith's revelations first called the Book of Commandments and later, as revised and expanded, the Doctrine and Covenants. Cowdery was also the editor, or on the editorial board, of several early church publications, including the Evening and Morning Star, the Messenger and Advocate, and the Northern Times.

When the church created a bank known as the Kirtland Safety Society in 1837, Cowdery obtained the money-printing plates. Sent by Smith to Monroe, Michigan, he became president of the Bank of Monroe, in which the church had a controlling interest. Both banks failed that same year. Cowdery moved to the newly founded Latter Day Saints settlement in Far West, Missouri, and suffered ill health through the winter of 1837–38.

Early written history of the church
In 1834 and 1835, with the help of Smith, Cowdery published a contribution to an anticipated "full history of the rise of the church of Latter Day Saints" as a series of articles in the church's Messenger and Advocate.  His version was not entirely congruent with the later official history of the church. For instance, Cowdery ignored the First Vision but described an angel (rather than God or Jesus) who called Smith to his work in September 1823.  He placed the religious revival that inspired Smith in 1823 (rather than 1820) and stated that this revival experience had caused Smith to pray in his bedroom (rather than the woods of the official history). Further, after first asserting that the revival had occurred in 1821, when Smith was in his "fifteenth year," Cowdery corrected the date to 1823 and stated that it was in Smith's 17th year (though 1823 was actually Smith's 18th year).

1838 split with Smith
By early 1838, Smith and Cowdery disagreed on three significant issues. First, Cowdery competed with Smith for leadership of the new church and "disagreed with the Prophet's economic and political program and sought a personal financial independence [from the] Zion society that Joseph Smith envisioned." Then too, in March 1838, Smith and Rigdon moved to Far West, which had been under the presidency of W. W. Phelps and Cowdery's brothers-in-law, David and John Whitmer. There Smith and Rigdon took charge of the Missouri church and initiated policies that Cowdery, Phelps, and the Whitmers believed violated the separation of church and state. Finally, in January 1838, Cowdery wrote his brother Warren that he and Smith"had some conversation in which in every instance I did not fail to affirm that which I had said was strictly true. A dirty, nasty, filthy affair of his and Fanny Alger's was talked over in which I strictly declared that I had never deserted from the truth in the matter, and as I supposed was admitted by himself."Alger, a teenage maid living with the Smiths in Kirtland, may have been Smith's first plural wife, a practice Cowdery opposed.

On April 12, 1838, a church court excommunicated Cowdery after he failed to appear at a hearing on his membership and sent a letter resigning from the church instead. David Whitmer was also excommunicated from the church at the same time and apostle Lyman E. Johnson was disfellowshipped; John Whitmer and Phelps had been excommunicated for similar reasons a month earlier.

Cowdery and the Whitmers became known as "the dissenters," but they continued to live in and around Far West, where they owned a great deal of property. On June 17, 1838, Sidney Rigdon announced to a large congregation that the dissenters were "as salt that had lost its savor" and that it was the duty of the faithful to cast them out "to be trodden beneath the feet of men." The Salt Sermon was seen as a threat against their lives and as an implicit instruction to the Danites, a secret vigilante group.

The Danite Manifesto was a letter addressed to Cowdery and the other dissenters which was signed by some 84 Mormons (but not Joseph Smith). It warned

you shall have three days after you receive this communication to you, including twenty-four hours in each day, for you to depart with your families peaceably; which you may do undisturbed by any person; but in that time, if you do not depart, we will use the means in our power to cause you to depart.

Cowdery and the dissenters fled the county. Reports about their treatment circulated in nearby non-Mormon communities and increased the tension that led to the 1838 Mormon War.

1838–48
From 1838 to 1848, Cowdery put the Latter Day Saints behind him.

He studied law and practiced at Tiffin, Ohio, where he became a civic and political leader. Cowdery also joined the Methodist church there and served as secretary in 1844. He edited the local Democratic newspaper until it was learned that he was one of the Book of Mormon witnesses; then he was assigned as assistant editor. In 1846, Cowdery was nominated as his district's Democratic Party candidate for the state senate, but when his Mormon background was discovered, he was defeated. Some contemporary Mormons believed that Cowdery had denied his testimony of the Book of Mormon, but there is no direct evidence of this, and Cowdery may even have repeated his testimony while estranged from the church, but there is no direct evidence of this, either.

 In Wisconsin
After the death of Joseph Smith (on June 27, 1844), a succession crisis split the Latter Day Saints. One faction followed James J. Strang as the next "Prophet, Seer, and Revelator". Strang claimed that he had found and translated ancient records engraved upon metal plates.

Cowdery's father, William, and his brother, Lyman, were followers of Strang, as were Martin Harris and initially, most of Joseph Smith's surviving family, including William Smith, Lucy Mack Smith, and three of Joseph's sisters. Strang called upon the Saints to gather in Voree, Wisconsin.

In 1847, Cowdery and his brother moved to Elkhorn, Wisconsin, about 12 miles away from Strang's headquarters in Voree. He entered law practice with his brother. He became co-editor of the Walworth County Democrat. In 1848, he ran for state assemblyman. However, his Mormon ties were revealed and he was defeated.

Member of The Church of Jesus Christ of Latter-day Saints
In 1848, Cowdery traveled to meet with followers of Brigham Young and the Quorum of the Twelve encamped at Winter Quarters, Nebraska, where he asked to be reunited with the church. The Quorum of the Twelve referred the application to the high council in Pottawattamie County, Iowa. The Pottawattamie high council convened a meeting with all high priests in the area to consider the matter. After Cowdery convinced the meeting attendees that he no longer maintained any claim to leadership within the church, the Pottawattamie high council and high priests in attendance unanimously approved his application for rebaptism. On November 12, 1848, Cowdery was rebaptized by Orson Hyde of the Quorum of the Twelve into—what had become following the succession crisis—The Church of Jesus Christ of Latter-day Saints, in Indian Creek at Kanesville, Iowa.

After his rebaptism, Cowdery desired to relocate to the State of Deseret (Utah) in the coming spring or summer, but due to financial and health problems he decided that he would not be able to make the journey in 1849. Because he was not with the Latter-day Saints in Utah, Cowdery was not immediately given a position of responsibility in the church, but in July 1849 Young wrote Cowdery a letter inviting him to travel to Washington, D.C., with Almon W. Babbitt to publicize the State of Deseret's desire for statehood and to draft a formal statehood application. Cowdery's deteriorating health did not allow him to accept this assignment, and within eight months he had died.

In 1912, the official church magazine Improvement Era published a statement by Jacob F. Gates, son of early Mormon leader Jacob Gates, who had died twenty years prior. According to the recollection by his son, the elder Gates had visited Cowdery in 1849 and inquired about his witness testimony concerning the Book of Mormon. Cowdery reportedly reaffirmed his witness:

"Jacob, I want you to remember what I say to you. I am a dying man, and what would it profit me to tell you a lie? I know," said he, "that this Book of Mormon was translated by the gift and power of God. My eyes saw, my ears heard, and my understanding was touched, and I know that whereof I testified is true. It was no dream, no vain imagination of the mind—it was real".; 

On March 3, 1850, Cowdery died in David Whitmer's home in Richmond, Missouri.

As purported co-author of the Book of Mormon

Those who doubt the miraculous origin theory of the Book of Mormon have speculated that Cowdery may have played a role in the work's composition. Latter-day Saint scholar Daniel Peterson, however, has noted that the original manuscript of the Book of Mormon seems to corroborate Smith's story in that it was in its majority dictated to Cowdery, with aural errors in it; and the Printer's Manuscript, in which Cowdery participated in producing, contains copyist errors with his calligraphy, rendering him unlikely of being aware of the content beforehand.

Speculation of pre-1829 connection between Cowdery and Smith
Cowdery was a third cousin of Lucy Mack Smith, Joseph Smith's mother.
There is also a geographical connection between the Smiths and the Cowderys. During the 1790s, both Joseph Smith, Sr. and Lucy Mack Smith, and two of Cowdery's relatives were living in Tunbridge, Vermont.

 New Israelites

Joseph Smith, Sr. and Cowdery's father, William, may have been members of a Congregationalist sect known as the New Israelites, organized in Rutland County, Vermont. The Cowdery family lived in Rutland County in the early 19th century and later attended a Congregationalist church in Poultney, Vermont. Witnesses from Vermont connected William Cowdery to the sect before these witnesses could have known that his son, Oliver, was a dowser.

Vermont residents interviewed by a local historian said that Joseph Smith, Sr. was also a member of the New Israelites and was one of its "leading rods-men".  But although residents said that he lived in Poultney, Vermont, "at the time of the Wood movement here", there are no other records placing Smith closer than about 50 miles away. On the other hand, Smith's involvement with the New Israelites would be consistent with his links to Congregationalism and the report from James C. Brewster than in 1837 Smith, Sr. admitted that he entered the money digging business "more than thirty years" ago.

Cowdery and View of the Hebrews

For several years, Cowdery and his family attended the Congregational Church in Poultney, Vermont, when its minister was the Rev. Ethan Smith, author of View of the Hebrews, an 1823 book suggesting that Native Americans were of Hebrew origin, a not uncommon speculation during the colonial and early national periods. In 2000, David Persuitte argued that Cowdery's knowledge of View of the Hebrews significantly contributed to the final version of the Book of Mormon, a connection first suggested as early as 1902. Fawn Brodie wrote that it "may never be proved that Joseph saw View of the Hebrews before writing the Book of Mormon, but the striking parallelisms between the two books hardly leave a case for mere coincidence." Richard Bushman and John W. Welch reject the connection and argue that there is little relationship between the contents of the two books.

Footnotes

References
Brooke, John L. The Refiner's Fire: The Making of Mormon Cosmology, 1644–1844. Cambridge University Press, Cambridge, 1994.
Cowdrey, Wayne L. Davis, Howard A. Vinik, Arthur Who Really Wrote the Book of Mormon? The Spalding Enigma Concordia Publishing House: St. Louis, 2005.
Gunn, Stanley R. Oliver Cowdery, Second Elder and Scribe. Bookcraft: Salt Lake City, 1962. 250-51.
Legg, Phillip R., Oliver Cowdery: The Elusive Second Elder of the Restoration, Herald House: Independence, Missouri, 1989.
Mehling, Mary, Cowdrey-Cowdery-Cowdray Genealogy p. 181, Frank Allaben: 1911.

Quinn, D. Michael, Early Mormonism and the Magic World View, Revised and enlarged (Salt Lake City: Signature Books, 1998), 36-39.
Smith, Joseph, B. H. Roberts, ed., History of the Church (Salt Lake City: Church of Jesus Christ of Latter-day Saints, 1902), seven volumes.
 Vogel, Dan, ed., Early Mormon Documents [EMD] (Salt Lake City: Signature Books, 1998), five volumes.
Welch, John W. and Morris, Larry E., eds., Oliver Cowdery: Scribe, Elder, Witness (Provo, UT: The Neal A. Maxwell Institute for Religious Scholarship, 2006); .

Further reading

External links

 
 
 
 Oliver Cowdery, by Dale R. Broadhurst, at olivercowdery.com
 Oliver Cowdery's Genealogy, at olivercowdery.com
 
 
 Oliver Cowdry legal documents, MSS SC 355 at L. Tom Perry Special Collections, Harold B. Lee Library, Brigham Young University
 Oliver Cowdrey stipulation in estate settlement, MSS SC 258 at L. Tom Perry Special Collections, Harold B. Lee Library, Brigham Young University
 Oliver Cowdery notarized affidavit, MSS SC 1035 at L. Tom Perry Special Collections, Harold B. Lee Library, Brigham Young University
 Oliver Cowdery docket book, MSS 4029 at L. Tom Perry Special Collections, Harold B. Lee Library, Brigham Young University

1806 births
1850 deaths
American Latter Day Saint leaders
American Latter Day Saint missionaries
Angelic visionaries
Apostles of the Church of Christ (Latter Day Saints)
Book of Mormon witnesses
Converts to Mormonism
Doctrine and Covenants people
Editors of Latter Day Saint publications
Latter Day Saint missionaries in the United States
Leaders in the Church of Christ (Latter Day Saints)
Members of the First Presidency (LDS Church)
Official historians of the Church of Jesus Christ of Latter-day Saints
Ohio Democrats
People excommunicated by the Church of Christ (Latter Day Saints)
People from Elkhorn, Wisconsin
People from Wells, Vermont
Religious leaders from Vermont
Wisconsin Democrats